The  were a class of escort ships in the service of the Imperial Japanese Navy during World War II.  The Japanese called them "Type D" coast defence ships, and they were the sixth class of Kaibōkan (Kai = sea, ocean, Bo = defence, Kan = ship), a name used to denote a multi-purpose vessel. 143 ships were ordered under the 1943-44 Programme, and a further 57 units were planned (but never ordered) under the 1944-45 Programme, for an overal total of 200 ships. However only 67 were completed, with the remainder being cancelled.

Background

On 22 April 1943, the Navy General Staff decided a mass production of escort ships, because of the urgent need to protect the convoys which were under constant attack. The plan was to build a basic escort ship of around 800 tons, with a simple design for easy construction. 
The first designs, for "Type A"  and "Type B" Mikura class, still needed too many man-hours for building, so in June 1943, the Navy General Staff planned for a simplified design. The result was the Ukuru class, and a scaled-down model of the Mikura class, which became the "Type C" (with diesel engines driving twin screws) and "Type D" (with turbine engines driving a single screw) escort classes.

Design
Because of Japan's deteriorating war situation, the Type D version was a further simplification of the Ukuru design and were built to the same design as the Type C escort ship. However, due to a shortage of diesel engines to power both groups of vessels, the Type D were powered by turbine engines. The Type D was the only Kaibōkan type to use turbines.

They were smaller by 200 tons than the Ukurus and engines that propelled them were also smaller, at  versus  for the Ukurus. The number of  guns went from three to two. The number of depth charges aboard was the same, 120, but the number of depth charge throwers was decreased from 18 to 12 and the depth charge chutes were decreased from two to one.

Due to the simplifications of the design, a significant saving was made in construction time. The Type D escorts required approximately 20,000 man-hours each, compared to the 35,000 man-hours of the Ukurus and the 57,000 man-hours of the Mikuras.

Construction
The design work for the Type D ships started in March 1943, at the same time as for the Ukuru class. They were built concurrently with the Ukuru class and Type C vessels. The Type D were given even number designations while the Type C were given odd numbers. The Type D were constructed using prefabricated sections that enabled them to be built in as little as three to four months. The lead ship, No.2 (CD-2) was constructed at Yokosuka Naval Arsenal, laid down on 5 October 1943, launched on 30 December 1943, and completed on 28 February 1944. CD-198 was the fastest build, being constructed in only 71 days; she was laid down on 31 December 1944, and completed on 11 March 1945. CD-204 was the last of the class being laid down on 27 February 1945 at the Nagasaki shipyard of Mitsubishi Heavy Industries, launched on 14 April 1945, and completed on 14 April 1945.

Service

Most of the Type D escorts were assigned to the Escort Fleet. However, they were not able to stop the American submarine offensive. One drawback was they did not have an effective fire-control system. They were equipped only with one height rangefinder for the AA guns and were powerless against an air attack. Despite being simple to construct they proved themselves very durable for their size. Of the 22 instances of torpedoes striking them, they survived 9 times, with CD-30 being struck and surviving on two separate occasions. Of the seven occasions when they struck mines, only one sank. During the war 68 ships were finished out of the 200 planned; 25 were sunk during the war.

Successes
  was sunk on 24 August 1944 by CD-22.
  was probably sunk on 11 November 1944 by CD-4.
  may also have been sunk by CD-4 on 4 January 1945, though evidence is unclear.
  was probably sunk by CD-8, CD-32, and CD-52 with Okinawa on 9 April 1945.
  was sunk on 19 June 1945 by CD-158 with CD-63, CD-75 and CD-207 and Okinawa.
  was rendered unfit for further service by damage from CD-22 with CD-33 and CD-29 on 30 October 1944.
  was rendered unfit for further service by damage from CD-6 on 14 November 1944.
  was probably sunk by CD-38 which reported having contact with and sinking a US Navy submarine on 19 October 1944 near Escolars expected position. Escolar was never heard from again.

Ships in class
Under the Wartime Naval Armaments Supplement Programme, it was proposed to build 300 Type C and 200 Type D escorts. These were assigned the Programme numbers #2401-#2700 for the Type C vessels, with #2701-#2900 for the Type D vessels. In view of the vast number intended, no names were allocated, but only numbers; odd numbers from No.1 upwards were assigned to Type C escorts, while even numbers from No.2 upwards were assigned to Type D escorts.
 
The first 143 of the Type D escorts were authorised under the 1943 Fiscal Year, but just 66 were completed and the others cancelled. The remaining 57 Type D vessels were intended to be built under the 1944 Fiscal Year, but no contracts were ever issued.

See also
Hiburi-class escort ship
Shimushu-class escort ship
Type C escort ship
Destroyer escort
Tacoma-class frigate
Flower-class corvette
PCE-842-class patrol craft

Notes

References

 Worth, Richard, Fleets of World War II, Da Capo Press (2001), 
 Conway's All the World's Fighting Ships 1922-1946 (1980)

External links
Type D class combinedfleet.com (Retrieved 14 July 2009)
 D type escorts IJN
 (Retrieved 14 July 2009)

Type D escort ships
Escort ship classes
Escort ships of the Imperial Japanese Navy
Ships of the Republic of China Navy
Ships of the People's Liberation Army Navy